Acapela Group (stylized acapela group) is a Swedish-Belgian company that develops text-to-speech software and services. It was formed in December 2003 from a combination of three European companies specializing in vocal technologies, Babel Technologies (Belgium), Infovox (Sweden) and Elan Speech (France).

Today, Acapela provides text-to-speech capabilities for languages including Arabic, Czech, Danish, Dutch, English, Finnish, French, German, Greek, Italian, Norwegian, Polish, Portuguese, Russian, Spanish, Swedish and Turkish.

See also
 Comparison of speech synthesizers
 Comparison of screen readers
 Chinese speech synthesis
 Microsoft text-to-speech voices

References

External links
 Acapela's website

Software companies established in 2003
Speech synthesis software
2003 establishments in Belgium